This article is about physical therapy in carpal tunnel syndrome.

Physical therapists and occupational therapists are involved in the assessment and intervention process with clients with carpal tunnel syndrome (CTS). Within the area of intervention, PTs and OTs provide education; symptom management techniques such as splinting; and modification of specific tasks, equipment and environment.

Assessment
Tinel's sign and Phalen's tests can be used to assess for CTS. They may be administered by the physical therapist (PT) or occupational therapist (OT). Tinel's sign involves tapping at the volar wrist while Phalen's test involves maintaining maximum wrist flexion for 60 seconds. In both tests, a positive sign is indicated by numbness, tingling or pain in the thumb, index and half of the middle finger. The presence of positive Tinel sign, Phalen sign, Flick sign, or Upper limb neural tension test independently have weak evidence for diagnosing CTS.  However, when these provocative tests are combined, they are far more reliable for diagnosing this condition. Following positive signs, the PT or OT may perform manual muscle testing for grip and pinch strength and assess range of motion.

The clinician may perform a detailed step-by-step breakdown of what's involved in the activity to look at the specific tasks that could be affected by or be contributing to CTS symptoms. For example, the PT or OT may analyze the activity of cooking. They may find, for example, that repetitive lifting of heavy skillets is a contributing factor to the individual's CTS symptoms. They may also observe the environment in which the activity is being performed and identify risk factors and compensatory strategies.

Intervention
PTs and OTs provide protective and corrective non-surgical measures for CTS and focus intervention on the person's physical abilities, environment, and the activities they engage in. Intervention has an emphasis on enabling function in self-care activities, leisure and paid or unpaid work. At the level of person, therapists can provide education and/or direct intervention for physical symptom treatment and management. At the levels of environment and occupation, PTs and OTs provide education and modifications related to the method of task completion, including equipment and tools used, and the setting in which it is being performed.

PTs and OTs who provide intervention for individuals with CTS may also be hand therapists. In addition Physical Therapists may have residency and fellowship training concerning the treatment of hands. Bash & Farber state that to become a hand therapist, an individual must be a physical or occupational therapist with at least 5 years experience, including 2000 hours of therapy pertaining directly to hands, and a certification exam is required.

Education
PTs and OTs play a large role as educators. Education may be provided to an individual client or a group of people. Individuals with CTS or at risk for CTS may benefit from education in the areas outlined below:
signs & symptoms of CTS
options for treatment: surgical and/or non surgical interventions
how to reduce risks & decrease symptoms of CTS
splint wearing regimen
body mechanics & exercises
task adaptation
adaptive tools
workplace adaptations

Splinting
PTs and OTs often use wrist splinting as a form of treatment. Splints may be pre-fabricated or custom-fit. Prefabricated splints are sold in health care supply stores and are an inexpensive option for clients. Prefabricated splints may be used but the fit may not be precise enough for all individuals. In this case, a custom fit splint is required. A OT will fabricate a custom-fit splint by molding thermoplastic material unique to the client's hand, wrist and forearm.

Splints can be based on the front (palmar), back (dorsal) or outer side (pinky) of the arm. According to Muller et al.’s systematic review on interventions for CTS, volar cock-up splints and ulnar gutter splints are similar in their improvement of symptoms and function. Dorsal splints are also recommended for CTS as they reduce pressure placed on the volar wrist.

Splints aim to immobilize the wrist to decrease pressure in the carpal tunnel. Restricting wrist motion eliminates the repetitive movement and tension overload in the carpal tunnel. This gives the tendon sheaths a chance to heal, reducing swelling, which then may decrease the pressure on the median nerve.

Splints also aim to keep the wrist at a certain angle to decrease pressure within the carpal tunnel. Although there has been debate about the best angle for wrist immobilization, the authors of a systematic review on non surgical carpal tunnel treatments conclude that “there is limited evidence that the use of a wrist splint in neutral position is more effective than an extended wrist position of 20 degrees in patients with CTS in the short term.” 

In another systematic review on interventions for CTS, Muller et al. found that wearing a nocturnal splint as well as wearing a splint during aggravating activities alleviate symptoms of CTS (numbness, pain and tingling) better than no treatment. It follows that decreasing symptoms of CTS improves overall occupational function in activity. Splinting is also suggested in reversible cases of CTS such as pregnancy along with other conservative treatment options.

Other
An occupational or physiotherapist working as a hand therapist may be involved in other areas of treatment for the symptoms of CTS depending on their scope of practice. These treatments may include but are not limited to ultrasound, electromagnetic field therapy, magnetic therapy, low level-laser therapy, or nerve gliding exercises. According to the recent research, ultrasound and carpal bone mobilization has limited evidence.  The evidence for nerve gliding exercises/ neural mobilization is unclear but addition of those exercises in conservative treatment may accelerate functional recovery.

Modification of occupation
Modification of a task is about adjusting behaviors and actions that may contribute to the development or exacerbation of CTS. As part of the assessment, the PT or OT will conduct an activity analysis to identify areas where change may be needed. Once a task is analyzed, alternative methods can be negotiated or discussed with the client. As Doheny et al. suggest, tasks can be redesigned to include diversity and thus limit repetitive movements that can aggravate CTS. For example, Keir et al. suggest breaking up the repetitive action of using a computer mouse with other tasks because mouse use was shown to increase carpal tunnel pressure. This study also suggests minimizing wrist extension through appropriate body posture at the workstation that may help to reduce carpal tunnel pressure.

A review of the literature has found evidence supporting the use of exercise and/or rest breaks in reducing musculoskeletal discomfort during computer work. Faucett et al. found that people with CTS were more likely to continue with their current jobs if modifications were made to the tasks. Two of these modifications included limiting repetitive tasks and decreasing work time. PT's and OT's can provide recommendations on job modifications to reduce risk factors by modifying client's work tasks.

Modification of equipment
A major role of the therapist is to introduce modified equipment and adaptive aids to enable occupational performance despite physical limitations. Modifying equipment and tools can correct positioning of the hand (e.g. keep it in a more neutral position) and reduce the hand force required to complete an action. For example, Dolby Laboratories introduced hand tools that reduced the hand force required, distributed the force over a larger surface area of the hand, and corrected the positioning of the hand through specially shaped handles that did not impinge on the median nerve area of the palm. These tools were designed to reduce risk factors associated with cumulative trauma disorders such as CTS. For example, specialized spring-loaded pliers reduced the force required to cut wire for electronic assembly purposes.

Adaptive aids can be useful in enabling individuals with CTS to participate in their chosen activities. One such adaptation is increasing the diameter of handles so that less grip strength is needed to grasp an object. Any handle can be built up in this way. For example, someone who has CTS may have difficulty holding their toothbrush or utensils while eating. Therapists can easily adapt these tools or purchase already adapted tools for a client. Specific risk factors that can contribute to CTS such as vibration can be reduced by introducing new tools with lower vibration levels as well as anti-vibration gloves.

Modification of environment
Another important avenue of therapy is adapting the environment to facilitate occupational performance of a particular task. When modifying an environment, often the equipment and tool adaptations are part of that environmental change.

In the management of CTS, workstation modification (i.e., adapting the work environment) is a large part of the intervention. By adjusting the workstation equipment, such as desks, chairs, monitors, and keyboards, the ideal position of the wrist and forearm can be achieved. This can help alleviate symptoms of CTS as well as prevent further damage and strain. For example, there is moderate evidence that a modified ergonomic keyboard is more effective than a regular keyboard at relieving symptoms of CTS. The addition of forearm supports can help to facilitate appropriate posture of the wrist by preventing extension while using a mouse.

Attention should also be given to psychosocial aspects of a work environment, such as job demands and job control, as they may help or hinder return to work and level of functioning within the workplace for those individuals with CTS.

Similar to the work environment, therapists can help adapt the home environment through the introduction of adaptive aids and adjustment of furniture or equipment.

The interventions for CTS mentioned above can be used together as illustrated in a study by Bash and Farber. These authors found that many hand therapists with symptoms of CTS not only wore splints but also engaged in modifying their tasks, tools and environments as part of their own intervention plan. Hand therapists are an example of a population that has been found to have high instances of CTS due to repetitive, stressful movements on the job. The hand therapists in this study used the following intervention strategies and reported symptom relief:
made ergonomic changes to the work station (modify environment)
used adaptive scissors and shears (modify tools/equipment)
reheated splint material to trim edges (modify task)
changed hand position (modify task)
used assistive equipment for scar massage (modify tools/equipment)

References

Carpal tunnel syndrome
Carpal tunnel syndrome
Musculoskeletal disorders